Santee is a surname. Notable people with the surname include:

Corey Santee (born 1983), American basketball player
David Santee (born 1957), American figure skater
Milton Santee (1835–1901), American civil engineer, surveyor, miner, real estate developer, and entrepreneur
Wes Santee (1932–2010), American athlete